El Corazón Decide is the 27th album and 22nd studio album recorded by Puerto Rican singer Ednita Nazario. It was released worldwide on October 22, 2013.  The album was recorded in Miami and London; and contains songs from international artists like Pedro Capó, Leonel García and Kany Garcia, who composed the first single from the album La Más Fuerte.  The album follows the same musical and lyrical formula of her last previous recordings.

Track listing

La Más Fuerte Tour
La Más Fuerte Tour is the concert tour  by Ednita Nazario in support of her studio album El Corazón Decide.

Tour dates

Setlist La Más Fuerte Tour - Coliseo de Puerto Rico José Miguel Agrelot (May 9 & 10, 2014)

1. A mí no

2. No

3. Medley: Más que un amigo / Sin querer / La pasión tiene memoria

4. El corazón decide

5. Puedo

6. Así es la vida sin ti (*Only May 9.)

7. Medley: A que pides más / Más mala que tú / No te mentía / Si no me amas

8. Tres deseos

9. Olvídame

10. Medley: No me dejes no (Give a little bit) / Me quedo aquí abajo / Mañana

11. Llorar por ti (a dueto con Pedro Capó)

12. Te quedas en mí (Homenaje póstumo al comediando puertorriqueño Luis Raúl)

13. Medley: Te sigo esperando / No voy a llorar / Dime / Desearía / Sobrevivo

14. Medley: Corazón / Alma de gitana

15. Más grande que grande

16. Te tengo a ti (a dueto con Caro Lina)

17. Medley: Después de ti / A que no le cuentas / Tú sin mí / Quiero que me hagas el amor

18. Para el peor amante

19. Empezar a vivir

20. La más fuerte

Festivals and other miscellaneous performances 
 These concert is part of the "Festival de la Leche Fresca".
 These concert is part of the "22 Gala Anual de la Fundación Juntos por una Misma Causa".

References

2013 albums
Ednita Nazario albums